At the 2011 Pan Arab Games, the tennis events were held at Khalifa International Tennis and Squash Complex in Doha, Qatar from 6–16 December. A total of 6 events were contested.

Medal summary

Medal table

Medal events

References

External links
Tennis at official website

Pan Arab Games
Events at the 2011 Pan Arab Games
2011 Pan Arab Games